Age of Innocence is a 2002 South Korean television series starring Go Soo, Kim Min-hee and Park Jung-chul. It aired on SBS from July 3 to August 22, 2002, every Wednesday and Thursday at 21:55 (KST).

Storyline
Lee Tae-seok (Go Soo), Hong Ji-yoon (Kim Min-hee), and Kim Min-soo (Yeo Hyun-soo) are best friends in high school. Tae-seok, the son of divorced parents, lives with his father. He and his best friend Min-soo both fall in love with Ji-yoon. For this reason, Tae-seok hides his love for Ji-yoon. Unfortunately for Min-soo, Ji-yoon returns Tae-seok's feelings. One day, Min-soo witnesses a kiss between Tae-seok and Ji-yoon. Feeling betrayed, he commits suicide in front of Tae-seok.

Seven years later, Tae-seok is a serious CF producer and has a new best friend named Yoo Dong-hwa (Park Jung-chul). Incidentally, the woman Dong-hwa wants to marry is Ji-yoon, Tae-seok's first love. Fate has once again toyed with Tae-seok as Ji-yoon is reintroduced to him as his best friend's girlfriend. In another twist of fate, the woman who now loves Tae-seok is Min-soo's sister. Tae-seok must make a decision between the two women, but does not want to make the same mistake he made 7 years ago. However, Dong-hwa soon discovers Ji-yoon and Tae-seok's past, as told by Min-soo's sister. Dong-hwa can't help but feel betrayed, just as Min-soo did in the past.

Cast

Main
 Go Soo as Lee Tae-seok
 Kim Min-hee as Hong Ji-yoon
 Park Jung-chul as Yoo Dong-hwa

Supporting

People around Lee Tae-seok
 Kim Kap-soo as Tae-seok's father
 Yeo Hyun-soo as Kim Min-soo
 Han Eun-jung as Kim Min-kyung, Min-soo's sister
 Koo Jun-yup as Lee Young-hee, Tae-seok's roommate

People around Hong Ji-yoon
 Choi Jong-won as Ji-yoon's paternal aunt's husband
 Oh Mi-yeon as Ji-yoon's paternal aunt
 Lee Ah-hyun as Yoon Ae, Ji-yoon's paternal aunt's elder daughter
 Im Seo-yeon as Yoon Kyung, Ji-yoon's paternal aunt's younger daughter

People around Yoo Dong-hwa
 Jeong Wook as Dong-hwa's father
 Park Jung-soo as Dong-hwa's mother

Others
 Kim Yoon-sung as Oh Tae-sung
 Han Sang-jin as Ji-yoon's friend
 Kim Hee-jung as Chief of Public Relations Office
 Jang Ho-jun
 Min Jung-sup

Production
The original title was "Loving You". As a result, the theme song of the MBC drama Romance (2002) was changed in a hurry because "Loving You" appeared in one passage.

Song Hye-kyo was planned to appear in this series but she rejected, citing that it was not polite to appear in this series which had the same time slot as MBC drama Ruler of Your Own World (2002) which she rejected. Initially, Ryoo Seung-bum was planned to star in this series, but when he considered filming problems, Park Jung-chul replaced him.

References

External links
  
 Age of Innocence at Cineseoul
 Age of Innocence at SBS Pro

Seoul Broadcasting System television dramas
2002 South Korean television series debuts
2002 South Korean television series endings
Korean-language television shows
South Korean romance television series